Dolophrosynella balteata is a moth of the family Stathmopodidae. It is found in Queensland.

Taxonomy
When first described, this species was included in the family Sesiidae.

External links
Image at CSIRO Entomology
Australian Faunal Directory
Classification of the Superfamily Sesioidea (Lepidoptera: Ditrysia) 

Moths of Australia
Stathmopodidae
Moths described in 1919